Polydroso (before 1957: Βλαχώρι - Vlachori) is a small village in the municipal unit of Paramythia in Thesprotia, Greece. Its population in 2011 was 73. It is situated on a forested mountainside above the left bank of the river Thyamis, at about 450 m elevation. It is 10 km southwest of Voutsaras, 24 km northeast of Igoumenitsa and 31 km west of Ioannina. The Greek National Road 6 (Igoumenitsa - Ioannina - Larissa) passes east of the village.

Population

History

Archaeological remains in the surrounding area date as far back as the 4th century BC. The present settlement was founded around 1790, and it is documented since 1827. Many of the present residents descend from people who arrived here from the village Sotira in Dropull i Sipërm (Ano Deropoli), Albania around 1800.

See also

List of settlements in Thesprotia

References

External links
Official website
Polydroso at the GTP Travel Pages

Populated places in Thesprotia